Labia is a genus of earwigs belonging to the family Spongiphoridae.

The genus has almost cosmopolitan distribution.

Species:

Labia bhaktapurensis 
Labia fanta 
Labia harpya 
Labia minor 
Labia phanduwalensis 
Labia pluto

References

Spongiphoridae
Dermaptera families